Eicochrysops distractus is a butterfly in the family Lycaenidae. It is found in Ethiopia, northern Uganda, Kenya, Tanzania (Mount Longido) and Yemen.

References

Butterflies described in 1913
Eicochrysops
Taxa named by Ruggero Verity
Taxa named by Joseph de Joannis